Terror(s) or The Terror may refer to:

Politics
 Reign of Terror, commonly known as The Terror, a period of violence (1793–1794) after the onset of the French Revolution
 Terror (politics), a policy of political repression and violence

Emotions 
 Fear, the emotional response to a threat or danger
 Angst, a form of anxiety or fear described in existentialist philosophy
 Anxiety, a sense of dread
 Panic, a sudden overwhelming fear

Arts, entertainment and media

Fictional entities
 Terror (Marvel Comics), a Marvel Comics character
 Terror (New England Comics), a supervillain 
 Terror, a land/sea/airship in Jules Verne's novel Master of the World

Film
 The Terror (1917 film), an American silent film
 The Terror (1920 film), an American western film starring Tom Mix
 Terror (1924 film), a French film starring Pearl White
 The Terror (1926 film), an American western film
 The Terror (1928 film), an American horror film directed by Roy Del Ruth
 The Terror (1938 film), a British crime film
 The Terror (1963 film), an American horror film directed by Roger Corman
 Terror (1977 film), a Danish horror film
 Terror (1978 film), a British horror film
(T)ERROR (2015), an American documentary
 Terror (2016 film), an Indian film

Music
 Terror (band), a band from California
 Terror (demo), a 1994 demo tape by thrash metal band Evildead
 Terrors (EP), a 2001 D'espairsRay EP
 Terror (album), a 2004 album by Loudness
 The Terror (album), a 2013 album by The Flaming Lips
 "Terror", a song by Susumu Hirasawa from Detonator Orgun 2
 "Terror", a song by My Ruin from Speak and Destroy
 "T-Error", a song by Die Ärzte from Geräusch
 "Terrifying" (song), by the British rock band the Rolling Stones from their 1989 album Steel Wheels

Television
 Terror (TV series), a Viceland documentary series
 "Terror" (Bottom), an episode of the British sitcom Bottom
 "Terrors", a 2011 episode of Young Justice
 The Terror (TV series), a 2018 AMC-TV series based on Dan Simmons' 2007 novel
 The Terror: Infamy, season 2 of the AMC-TV series The Terror

Other uses in arts, entertainment, and media
 Terror Illustrated, a 1950s magazine 
 Terror Inc., a 1990s comic book series 
 The Terror (novel), a 2007 novel by Dan Simmons
 The Terror (play), by the British writer Edgar Wallace

Places
Mount Terror (Antarctica)
Mount Terror (Washington), United States

Vessels
 HMS Terror, several ships of the Royal Navy
 Spanish destroyer Terror, a ship that fought in the Spanish–American War
 USS Terror, several ships of the U.S Navy
 Terror (boat), a British sailboat used to transport oysters ashore from larger vessels, built c. 1890

Sports
 Houston Thunderbears, an Arena Football League team originally called the Texas Terror
 Tampa Bay Terror, a defunct indoor soccer team based in Tampa Bay, Florida, U.S.

Other uses
 Horror and terror, literary and psychological concepts, especially in Gothic literature
 Terror, a rapper featured on the album My World, My Way

See also

Red Terror (disambiguation)
Terroir, the influence of local growing conditions on the taste of wine or other food or drink
The Terror (disambiguation)
White Terror (disambiguation)